The Metropolis of Kiev, Galicia and all Ruthenia was an ecclesiastical territory or archdiocese (archeparchy) of the Ruthenian Uniate Church, a particular Eastern Catholic Church. It was erected in the Polish–Lithuanian Commonwealth in 1595/96 following the Union of Brest. It was effectively disestablished by the partitions of Poland (1772–1795). Its successor — the Ukrainian Greek Catholic Church — continues to operate in the modern states of Ukraine and Poland. The first metropolitan was Michael Rohoza.

Ecclesiastical structure

Within the Commonwealth, the metropolis had the following suffragan dioceses and archdioceses (archeparchies):
 Archeparchy of Polotsk
 Archeparchy of Smolensk (1625-1778)
 Eparchy of Lutsk and Ostroh (1594-1636, 1702-1795 and 1789–1839) During the Great Northern War, Volhynia was occupied by Russian troops and the eparchy was converted to Orthodoxy until the withdrawal of troops.
 Eparchy of Turov and Pinsk
 Eparchy of Volodymyr and Brest
 Eparchy of Lviv
 Eparchy of Chełm
 Eparchy of Przemyśl and Sambir

Pope Clement VIII's 1596 bull Decet Romanum Pontificem gave metropolitans the same rights that Kievan metropolitans had enjoyed under Constantinople. In elections for the office, candidates were chosen by direct vote of the assembled bishops and by the Superior-General (Proto-Archimandrite) of the Basilian order. He would then be nominated by the Polish king and confirmed by the pope.

History

For much of the 17th century, the Polish–Lithuanian Commonwealth was at war with the Tsardom of Moscow. The Khmelnytsky Uprising (1648–1657) also known as the Cossack–Polish War, was a Cossack rebellion in the eastern territories of the Commonwealth, which led to the creation of a Cossack Hetmanate in right-bank Ukraine. As a result, the Kiev and Chernihiv dioceses which lay in the hetmanate were lost to the metropolis as the Cossacks were firmly anti-Catholic.

While most Orthodox bishops in the Polish–Lithuanian Commonwealth supported the Union of Brest, as with the previous Florentine Union, not all of them accepted the union. Some eparchies (dioceses) continued to give their loyalty to Constantinople. These dissenters had no ecclesiastical leaders but with Petro Konashevych-Sahaidachny — the Hetman of the Zaporozhian Cossacks — they had a secular leader who was opposed to the union with Rome. The Cossacks' strong historic allegiance to the Eastern Orthodox Church put them at odds with the Catholic-dominated Commonwealth. Tensions increased when Commonwealth policies turned from relative tolerance to the suppression of the Orthodox church, making the Cossacks strongly anti-Catholic. By that time, the loyalty of the Zaporozhian hetmanate to the Commonwealth was only nominal. In August 1620, the Hetman prevailed upon Theophanes III — the Greek Orthodox Patriarch of Jerusalem — to re-establish an Orthodox metropolis in the realm. Theophanes consecrated Job Boretsky as the new "Metropolitan of Kiev, Galicia and all Ruthenia" and as the "Exarch of Ukraine". There were now two metropolitans with the same title but different ecclesiastical loyalties within the Commonwealth.

By 1686 Russia had complete sovereignty over the lands of the Zaporozhian Sich and left-bank Ukraine, as well as the city of Kiev. The Eternal Peace Treaty of 1686 which was concluded by Russia and the Commonwealth affirmed this reality. As a result, the Greek Catholic population in those areas suffered oppression and many deaths. It also spelled an end to the independence and unity of the Hetman state. The Starodub, Chernihiv, and other territories in left-bank Ukraine went to Muscovy; the rest remained in the Commonwealth.

The end of the Commonwealth came with the partitions of Poland when the Tsardom of Russia, the Kingdom of Prussia and the Habsburg monarchy divided the realm between them.  Following the partitions, its successor states treated the Uniate Church differently:

 In the territory annexed by the Russian Empire, the Church was effectively dissolved; most of the eparchies were forcibly converted to the Russian Orthodox Church.
 In the territory annexed by the Kingdom of Prussia, the Eparchy of Supraśl operated from 1798 to 1809. Following the Treaties of Tilsit, the territory was annexed by the Russian Empire. As a result, the Church was effectively dissolved and the eparchy was forcibly converted to the Russian Orthodox Church.
 In the territory annexed by the Austrian Empire, the Church continued to operate as a Greek Catholic Church. A similar situation continued in the Second Polish Republic of 1918 to 1939. It was suppressed in the Soviet Union from 1946 but survived to become the core of the Ukrainian Greek Catholic Church from 1989.

List of metropolitans
This is a list of metropolitans of "Kiev, Galicia and all Ruthenia":
 1596—1599 Michael Rohoza 
 1600—1613 Hypatius Pociej 
 1613—1637 Joseph Velamin-Rutski
 1637—1640 Rafajil Korsak
 1641—1655 Antin Sielava
 1666—1674 Havryil Kolenda
 1674—1693 Kyprian Zochovskyj
 1694—1708 Lev Zalenskyj
 1708—1713 Yurij Vynnyckyj
 1714—1729 Lev Kiszka
 1729—1746 Athanasius Szeptycki
 1748—1762 Florian Hrebnicki
 1762—1778 Felicjan Filip Wołodkowicz
 1778—1779 Leo Szeptycki
 1780—1786 Jason Smogorzewski
 1787—1805 Theodosius Rostocki

References

Further reading

 
 
 
 
 
 

Metropolis of Kiev
Metropolis of Kiev, Galicia and all Ruthenia (Ruthenian Uniate Church)
1590s establishments in the Polish–Lithuanian Commonwealth
1800s disestablishments in the Russian Empire